Ariane is a one-act opera by Bohuslav Martinů to a French libretto by the composer drawn from the second, third and fourth acts of the 1943 play by Georges Neveux, Le Voyage de Thésée, (who had supplied the text to the composer's earlier opera Julietta).

Performance history
Martinů composed Ariane in 1958 whilst working on his final opera, The Greek Passion – he described it in a letter to his family as 'taking a rest' from the larger work. The composition took just over a month. The bravura style of the writing for Ariadne reflects Martinů's admiration of Maria Callas. The opera is in a straightforward lyrical style with deliberate references to the operas of Monteverdi and other early composers.

Grove describes the music as being in a "warm, mainly tonal lyricism", at times "enlivened by neo-Baroque rhythmic patterns".

The first performance took place in 1961 at the Musiktheater im Revier in Gelsenkirchen, Germany, as the centre-piece of a triple-bill with Mahagonny by Brecht and Weill and Der Analphabet by Ivo Lhotka-Kalinski, two years after the composer's death.

The Czech premiere took place on 23 October 1962 in Brno alongside Ariadne pieces by Claudio Monteverdi and Jiri Antonin Benda, conducted by Richard Tyn, with Miriam Šupurkovská in the title role. In September that year the opera was broadcast live radio on Czechoslovak Radio Brno, conducted by Frantisek Jilek, with Cecilie Strádalová.

The Russian premiere was in Moscow in March 2016, conducted by Maria Maksimchuk.

Roles

Synopsis
The story is a surrealist version of the myth of Theseus, Ariadne, and the Minotaur.

In this version of the myth, the Minotaur and Theseus look alike - and Theseus discerns part of his own personality in the monster; by killing it he destroys his love for Ariadne.

Prologue – Sinfonia 1
The Watchman learns of the arrival in Knossos of Thésée and his companions from a passing seagull.

Scene 1
Thésée seeks the Minotaur and encounters Ariane. In an ambiguous conversation they seem to fall in love – but Ariane's love may be in fact for the Minotaur. The Old Man announces that the king's daughter is to be married to a stranger. Ariane reveals that she is the king's daughter and Thésée is the stranger – and asks for his name.

Scene 2
After a second sinfonia, Bouroun is dissatisfied that Thésée's infatuation with Ariane is preventing him from killing the Minotaur. Resolving to do the deed himself, he is killed by the Minotaur (offstage). When the Minotaur appears, he turns out to be Theseus's double, and taunts him – "who dares lift his hand to strike himself a death-blow?". Thésée slays the Minotaur however.

Scene 3
A third sinfonia separates the scenes. Thésée and his companions desert Ariane, whose lyrical lament closes the opera.

The whole opera, including the three miniature sinfonias which introduce and punctuate it, lasts little more than 40 minutes (of which Ariane's lament takes about 9).

References

Sources
Grove Music Online
Notes to CD recording of the opera by Supraphon (1988), CD 104395-2 (Czech Philharmonic Orchestra conducted by Václav Neumann).

1961 operas
Operas
French-language operas
Operas by Bohuslav Martinů
One-act operas
Operas based on classical mythology
Ariadne
Cultural depictions of Theseus